Events in the year 1888 in Portugal.

Incumbents
Monarch: Louis I
Prime Minister: José Luciano de Castro

Events

21 June – first published issue of the newspaper Jornal de Notícias

Arts and entertainment
Os Maias – novel by José Maria de Eça de Queiroz

Sports

Births

22 August – Francisco Cunha Leal, politician (died 1970)
30 December – Ruimondo Mayer, fencer (died 1959).
13 June; Fernando Pessoa, Poet, writer, and translator (died 1935)

Deaths

References

 
1880s in Portugal
Portugal
Years of the 19th century in Portugal
Portugal